Francesco Romano (born 9 July 1997) is an Italian racing cyclist, who most recently rode for UCI ProTeam . In October 2020, he was named in the startlist for the 2020 Giro d'Italia.

Major results

2014
 2nd La Piccola SanRemo
 5th Overall Tour of Istria
 7th Road race, UEC European Junior Road Championships
 8th Overall GP Général Patton
2016
 4th Gran Premio Industrie del Marmo
 8th Ruota d'Oro
 10th Coppa Città di Offida
2017
 1st Stage 6 Girobio
 5th Gran Premio della Liberazione
 5th Trofeo Città di San Vendemiano
 6th Trofeo Piva
 9th Giro del Belvedere
 10th Overall Toscana-Terra di Ciclismo
2018
 2nd Trofeo Città di San Vendemiano
 7th Trofeo Edil C
 8th Trofeo Alcide Degasperi
 8th GP Capodarco

Grand Tour general classification results timeline

References

External links

1997 births
Living people
Italian male cyclists
People from Vittoria, Sicily
Sportspeople from the Province of Ragusa
Competitors at the 2018 Mediterranean Games
Mediterranean Games competitors for Italy
Cyclists from Sicily